Easy Riches is a 1938 British comedy film directed by Maclean Rogers and starring George Carney, Gus McNaughton, Marjorie Taylor and Tom Helmore.

Plot
Two rival firms of builders fight for business in a small town.

Cast
 George Carney - Sam Miller
 Gus McNaughton - Joe Hicks
 Molly Hamley-Clifford - Mrs Miller
 Tom Helmore - Harry Miller
 Marjorie Taylor - Dorothy Hicks
 Peter Gawthorne - Stacey Lang
 Aubrey Mallalieu - Mr Marsden
 Michael Ripper - Cuthbert

References

External links
 
 

1938 films
1938 comedy films
British comedy films
Films directed by Maclean Rogers
Films set in England
Films set in Paris
Quota quickies
British black-and-white films
1930s English-language films
1930s British films